Arthur Beauchamp (1827 – 28 April 1910) was a Member of Parliament from New Zealand. He is remembered as the father of Harold Beauchamp, who rose to fame as chairman of the Bank of New Zealand and was the father of writer Katherine Mansfield.

Biography

Beauchamp came to Nelson from Australia on the Lalla Rookh, arriving on 23 February 1861.

He lived much of his life in a number of locations around the top of the South Island, also Whanganui when Harold was 11 for seven years and then to the capital (Wellington). Then south to Christchurch and finally Picton and the Sounds. He had business failures and was bankrupted twice, in 1879 and 1884. He married Mary Stanley on the Victorian goldfields in 1854; Arthur and Mary lived in 18 locations over half a century, and are buried in Picton. Six of their ten children born between 1855 and 1893 died, including the first two sons born before Harold.

Beauchamp represented the Picton electorate from 1866 to 1867, when he resigned.  He had the energy and sociability required for politics, but not the private income then required to be a parliamentarian. He supported the working man and the subdivision of big estates, opposed the confiscation of Māori land and was later recognised as a founding Liberal, the party that Harold supported and was a "fixer" for. Yska calls their life an extended chronicle of rootlessness, business failure and almost ceaseless family tragedy and Harold called his father a rolling stone by instinct. 

Arthur also served on the council of Marlborough Province and is best-remembered for a 10-hour speech to that body when an attempt was made to relocate the capital from Picton to Blenheim.

In 1866 he attempted to sue the Speaker of the House, David Monro. At the time the extent of privilege held by Members of Parliament was unclear; a select committee ruled that the case could proceed, but with a stay until after the parliamentary session.

See also

References

1827 births
1910 deaths
New Zealand MPs for South Island electorates
People from the Marlborough Region
Local politicians in New Zealand
Members of the New Zealand House of Representatives
Australian emigrants to New Zealand
19th-century New Zealand politicians